Olímpico or Olímpica (Portuguese and Spanish for Olympic), may refer to:

 Albergue Olímpico, a training center located in Puerto Rico
 Associação Olímpica de Itabaiana, a Brazilian football (soccer) club
 Atlético Deportivo Olímpico, a Peruvian football (soccer) club
 Olímpico (born 1965), Mexican Luchador
 Olímpico Clube, a Brazilian football (soccer) club
 C.D. Olímpico Litoral, a Salvadoran football (soccer) club
 Club Olímpico de Totana, a Spanish football (soccer) club
 Ciclista Olímpico, an Argentine sports club
 Pequeño Olímpico (born 1971), Mexican Luchador
 Grêmio Esportivo Olímpico, a Brazilian football (soccer) club
 Olímpico Esporte Clube, a Brazilian football (soccer) club
 Olímpico Pirambu Futebol Clube, a Brazilian football (soccer) club
 Olímpico Peruano, a Peruvian football (soccer) club
 Prêmio Brasil Olímpico, a Brazilian sports award
 Olímpica metro station, station located in the State of Mexico
 Organización Radial Olímpica, a Colombian radio network
 Supermercados Olímpica, a Colombian supermarket chain

See also
 Estadio Olímpico (disambiguation)